Krzyżowice  (German Kreisewitz) is a village in the administrative district of Gmina Olszanka, within Brzeg County, Opole Voivodeship, in southern Poland.

The name of the village is of Polish origin and comes from the word krzyż, which means "cross".

Notable residents
Moritz Karl Ernst von Prittwitz (1795–1885), Prussian Lieutenant-General

References

Villages in Brzeg County